1,2-Dichlorotetrafluoroethane, or R-114, also known as cryofluorane (INN), is a chlorofluorocarbon (CFC) with the molecular formula ClFCCFCl.  Its primary use has been as a refrigerant.  It is a non-flammable gas with a sweetish, chloroform-like odor with the critical point occurring at 145.6 °C and 3.26 MPa.  When pressurized or cooled, it is a colorless liquid.  It is listed on the Intergovernmental Panel on Climate Change's list of ozone depleting chemicals, and is classified as a Montreal Protocol Class I, group 1 ozone depleting substance.

When used as a refrigerant, R-114 is classified as a medium pressure refrigerant.

The U.S. Navy uses R-114 in its centrifugal chillers in preference to R-11 to avoid air and moisture leakage into the system.  While the evaporator of an R-11 charged chiller runs at a vacuum during operation, R-114 yields approximately 0 psig operating pressure in the evaporator.

Dangers
Asides from its immense environmental impacts, R114, like most chlorofluoroalkanes, forms phosgene gas when exposed to a naked flame.

References

External links
 Material Safety Data Sheet from Honeywell International Inc., dated 22 August 2007.
 CDC - NIOSH Pocket Guide to Chemical Hazards

Chlorofluorocarbons
Refrigerants
Greenhouse gases
Ozone depletion
GABAA receptor positive allosteric modulators